R516 road may refer to:
 R516 road (Ireland)
 R516 (South Africa)